Mount Aaron is a mountain in the northwest part of the Latady Mountains in Palmer Land. Mapped by United States Geological Survey (USGS) from ground surveys and U.S. Navy air photos, 1961–67. It was named by the Advisory Committee on Antarctic Names (US-ACAN) for W.T. Aaron, electrician with the South Pole Station winter party in 1963.

Mountains of Palmer Land